René De Clercq (16 March 1945 – 1 January 2017) was a Belgian cyclo-cross cyclist. Professional from 1970 to 1976, he won a bronze medal at the 1971 UCI Cyclo-cross World Championships and was the UCI Amateur World Champion in 1969. He was the brother of Roger De Clercq and the father of Mario De Clercq, also professional cyclists.

Major results

1966–1967
 3rd National Championships
1967–1968
 3rd National Amateur Championships
1968–1969
 1st  UCI Amateur World Championships
1969–1970
 4th UCI Amateur World Championships
1970–1971
 3rd  UCI World Championships
 3rd National Championships

References

External links

1945 births
2017 deaths
Belgian male cyclists
Cyclo-cross cyclists
People from Compiègne
Sportspeople from Oise
Cyclists from Hauts-de-France